is a city located in Akita Prefecture, Japan. , the city had an estimated population of 44,346 in 17,789 households, and a population density of 56 persons per km². Yuzawa claims to be the birthplace of the famous Heian period poet Ono no Komachi.

Geography

Yuzawa is located at the far southeast corner of Akita Prefecture, bordered by mountains to the south, east and west.

Neighboring municipalities
Akita Prefecture
Yurihonjō
Yokote
Ugo
Higashinaruse
Yamagata Prefecture
Shinjō
Mogami
Kaneyama
Mamurogawa
Miyagi Prefecture
Kurihara
Ōsaki

Climate
Yuzawa has a humid continental climate (Köppen climate classification Dfa) with large seasonal temperature differences, with warm to hot (and often humid) summers and cold (sometimes severely cold) winters. Precipitation is significant throughout the year, but is heaviest from August to October.

Demographics
Japanese census data, the population of Yuzawa peaked in the 1950s and has declined since. The city is now smaller than it was a century ago.

History
The area of present-day Yuzawa was part of ancient Ugo Province, dominated by the Satake clan during the Edo period, who ruled Kubota Domain under the Tokugawa shogunate.

After the start of the Meiji period, Iwasaki Domain became briefly “Iwasaki Prefecture”, before becoming Ogachi District, Akita Prefecture in 1878. The towns of Iwasaki and Yuzawa were created with the establishment of the modern municipalities system on April 1, 1889, becoming the city of Yuzawa on March 31, 1954.

On March 22, 2005, the towns of Inakawa, Minase and Ogachi (all from Ogachi District) were merged into Yuzawa.

Government

Yuzawa has a mayor-council form of government with a directly elected mayor and a unicameral city legislature of 18 members. The city (together with the towns and villages of Ogachi District) contributes three members to the Akita Prefectural Assembly.  In terms of national politics, the city is part of Akita District 3 of the lower house of the Diet of Japan.

Elections 
 2005 Yuzawa mayoral election

Economy
The economy of Yuzawa is based on agriculture, primarily rice cultivation, and the brewing of sake. The production of sake in Yuzawa accounts for about 70% of the total amount in Akita prefecture and the city positions sake brewing as one of the key industries. Sake brewing in Yuzawa had been known through the Edo period since the area included Innai Silver Mine, a large consumption area comparable to the jōkamachi of Kubota Domain. At its highest, it had more than 20 breweries and some still operate to this day.

Education
Yuzawa has 11 public elementary schools and six public middle schools operated by the city government and four public high schools operated by the Akita Prefectural Board of Education. The prefecture also operates one special education school for the handicapped.

Media
FM Yutopia (JOZZ2AN-FM) is the only radio station located in Yuzawa. It is known as the second oldest community radio station in Akita Prefecture, airing on Feb 2, 1999.

Transportation

Railway
 East Japan Railway Company - Ōu Main Line
  -  -  -  -  -

Highway

Local attractions

Takanoyu Onsen

International relations

Twin towns – Sister cities
Yuzawa is twinned with:
 Csurgó, Hungary (1976) 
 Kushiro, Hokkaido (1987)
 Kulim, Malaysia (2003)

Other relations
Yuzawa carries out an exchange program for junior high school students with:
 Siegburg, Germany

Noted people from Yuzawa
 Terukuni Manzō, sumo wrestler
 Hiroe Kakizaki, basketball player
 Kiyokuni Katsuo, sumo wrestler
 Ryuzo Sato, economist
 Yoshihide Suga, former Prime Minister (2020-2021)
 Kantarō Suga, actor

References

External links

Official Website 

 
Cities in Akita Prefecture